Emmett Gene Hendricks (February 14, 1938 – May 18, 2003) was an American college basketball coach. He was the head coach of the Louisiana Tech Bulldogs basketball program from 1974 to 1977. In 2003, Hendricks died at the age of 65 after a lengthy illness.

Early life and education
Hendricks graduated from Marthaville High School, where he participated in basketball, baseball and track. After graduation from high school, he served in the United States Air Force for four years as a radar technician. He graduated from Northwestern State University in 1965 where he played basketball. He completed graduate work at North Texas State University.

Head coaching record

References

1938 births
2003 deaths
Basketball players from Louisiana
Guards (basketball)
Louisiana Tech Bulldogs basketball coaches
Northwestern State Demons basketball players
United States Air Force airmen
American men's basketball players
Basketball coaches from Louisiana
University of North Texas alumni